Oleg Vladimirovich Zoteyev (born 5 July 1989 in Olmaliq, Uzbek SSR) is an Uzbekistani footballer who plays as a midfielder for Lokomotiv Tashkent.

Career
On 26 December 2012 he  was signed by capital club Bunyodkor after 3 years playing at Olmaliq FK.
On 6 January 2015, Lokomtiv Tashkent announced signing Zoteyev. Zoteyev won his second Uzbekistan Supercup title with Lokomotiv on 8 March 2015 in a match against Pakhtakor.

International
In the 2012 Olympics Football Tournament qualifiers, he was called to the Uzbekistan U23 team and he scored 2 goals for his team.

In the 2014 FIFA World Cup qualifiers, he was called to the Uzbekistan senior team.

Career statistics

International goals
Scores and results list Uzbekistan's goal tally first.

Honours

Club
Bunyodkor
 Uzbek League (1): 2013
 Uzbek Cup (1): 2013
 Uzbek Cup runners-up (1): 2014
 Uzbekistan Super Cup (1): 2013

Lokomotiv
 Uzbekistan Super Cup (1): 2014

Jeonnam Dragons
 Korean FA Cup (1): 2021

References

External links 
 Oleg Zoteev - Eurosport UK
 
 
 
 

1989 births
Living people
Uzbekistani footballers
Uzbekistani expatriate footballers
Uzbekistan international footballers
Association football midfielders
Sportspeople from Tashkent
Uzbekistani people of Russian descent
2019 AFC Asian Cup players
Pakhtakor Tashkent FK players
FC AGMK players
FC Bunyodkor players
PFC Lokomotiv Tashkent players
Jeonnam Dragons players
FC Qizilqum Zarafshon players
Uzbekistani expatriate sportspeople in South Korea
Expatriate footballers in South Korea